The 2019 Copa Sudamericana Final was the final match to decide the winner of the 2019 Copa Sudamericana, the 18th edition of the Copa Sudamericana, South America's secondary international club football tournament organized by CONMEBOL.

The final was contested in a single match format between Ecuadorian team Independiente del Valle and Argentinian team Colón, at the Estadio General Pablo Rojas in Asunción, Paraguay on 9 November 2019. This was the first final to be played as a single match at a venue chosen in advance. 

Independiente del Valle defeated Colón by a 3–1 score to win their first Copa Sudamericana title. As champions, Independiente del Valle earned the right to play against the winners of the 2019 Copa Libertadores in the 2020 Recopa Sudamericana. They also automatically qualified for the 2020 Copa Libertadores group stage. They would also have played the winners of the 2019 J.League Cup in the 2020 J.League Cup / Copa Sudamericana Championship, but it would not be held due to the 2020 Tokyo Olympics scheduled to be held at the same time.

Teams

Venue

On 14 August 2018, CONMEBOL decided that starting from the 2019 edition, the final would be played as a single match, and although it was originally stated that the final would be played in Lima, Peru at the Estadio Nacional, on 9 May 2019 the confederation's Council decided to switch the venue to Estadio Defensores del Chaco in Asunción, Paraguay. On 21 June 2019, APF announced that Estadio General Pablo Rojas in Asunción would host the 2019 final due to remodeling works in Estadio Defensores del Chaco.

Show 
 	
Before the game, two bands identified with the finalist teams played on the field: Los Palmeras, for Colón, and La Vagancia, for Independiente. Then the Puerto Rican singer Luis Fonsi finished the show.

Road to the final

Note: In all scores below, the score of the home team is given first.

Format
The final was played as a single match at a venue pre-selected by CONMEBOL, with the higher-seeded team designated as the "home" team for administrative purposes (Regulations Article 25). If tied after regulation, 30 minutes of extra time would be played. If still tied after extra time, the penalty shoot-out would be used to determine the winner (Regulations Article 28).

Match
At 18:05 UTC−3, in the 32nd minute, the match was interrupted due to severe weather. The match resumed at 19:00 UTC−3.

See also
2019 Copa Libertadores Final
2020 Recopa Sudamericana

References

External links
CONMEBOL Sudamericana 2019, CONMEBOL.com

2019
Final
November 2019 sports events in South America
C.S.D. Independiente del Valle matches
Club Atlético Colón matches
2019 in Ecuadorian football
2019–20 in Argentine football
International club association football competitions hosted by Paraguay